Triumph of Chastity is an oil-on-canvas allegorical painting by the Italian Renaissance artist Lorenzo Lotto, created c. 1530, now in the Rospigliosi Pallavicini collection in Rome. It is signed at bottom right "Laurentius Lotus" and shows a female personification of Chastity (left) driving away Cupid and Venus. The Venus is based on that on an ancient Roman sarcophagus now in the Vatican Museums.

References

1530 paintings
16th-century allegorical paintings
Allegorical paintings by Italian artists
Paintings by Lorenzo Lotto
Paintings in Rome